Events in the year 1874 in Japan.

Incumbents
Emperor: Emperor Meiji
Empress consort: Empress Shōken

Governors
Aichi Prefecture: Washio Takashi
Akita Prefecture: Senkichi Kokushi 
Aomori Prefecture: J. Hishida then Masaomi Kitadai then Ikeda Tanenori
Ehime Prefecture: Egi Yasunao
Fukushima Prefecture: Taihe Yasujo
Gifu Prefecture: Toshi Kozaki
Gunma Prefecture: vacant 
Hiroshima Prefecture: Date Muneoki
Ibaraki Prefecture: Seki Shinpei 
Iwate Prefecture: Korekiyo Shima
Kagawa Prefecture: Mohei Hayashi 
Kochi Prefecture: Iwasaki Nagatake
Kyoto Prefecture: Masanao Makimura
Mie Prefecture: Masanao Makimura
Miyazaki Prefecture: Weiken Fukuyama
Nagano Prefecture: Narasaki Hiroshi
Niigata Prefecture: Kusumoto Masataka
Oita Prefecture: Kei Morishita
Osaka Prefecture: Norobu Watanabe
Saga Prefecture: Michitoshi Iwamura
Saitama Prefecture: Tasuke Shirane
Shiname Prefecture: Kamiyama Ren
Tochigi Prefecture: Iseki Ushitora
Tokyo: Miki Nabeshima
Toyama Prefecture: Tadahiro Okubo
Yamaguchi Prefecture: Mishima Michitsune

Events
February 16–April 9 - Saga Rebellion

Births
April 16 – Jōtarō Watanabe

Deaths

April 13 – Etō Shimpei (born 1834) and Shima Yoshitake (born 1822), rebel leaders (executed by beheading)

References

 
1870s in Japan
Years of the 19th century in Japan